Geisel Privathotels is a Munich-based private hotel and gastronomy group founded in 1900 and includes five hotels (Hotel Königshof, Hotel Excelsior, Anna Hotel, Cosmopolitan Hotel, Schwabinger Wahrheit) and three restaurants. The brothers, Carl, Michael and Stephan Geisel were awarded the title “Hotelier of the Year” in 2008.

Hotels

Hotel Königshof
The Hotel Königshof, which was reopened for the 1972 Munich Olympic Games is a luxury hotel with 71 double rooms, 16 suites and 180 underground parking places. The hotel is located directly in central Munich at the Karlsplatz/Stachus and only 500m from Munich's main train station. Subway and tram stations are available in front of the hotel. Travel times to the airport are 40 minutes and to the exhibition center 20 minutes.
The Hotel Königshof is one of the most renowned establishments in Munich and a member of “The Leading Small Hotels of the World”. The wine store “Geisels Weingalerie” (previously “allaboutwine”), which was established in 2000 by Stephan Geisel, is located in the ground floor. The Gourmet Restaurant Königshof is accredited with one Michelin Star and recognized with 18 of 20 possible points by Gault Millau.

Hotel Excelsior
The first class Hotel Excelsior was reopened in 1959 and is located in central Munich, 150 meters from the main train station and nearby to the Hotel Königshof and the anna hotel. It includes 104 double rooms as well as 8 suites. In 1989, the Hotel Excelsior helped establish the “Summit Hotels & Resorts” cooperation agreement. Hotel Excelsior also houses Geisel's Vinothek that has a selection of over 400 wines, and a show kitchen, which can be rented for private or company events.

Anna Hotel
The design hotel was opened in 2002 and lies in the heart of Munich directly near the historical Karlsplatz/Stachus, 500 meter from the main train station and 10 minutes walking distance to the famous Marienplatz. Travel times to the airport are 40 minutes and to the exhibition centre 20 minutes.
The Anna Hotel is equipped with 63 double rooms, 5 tower rooms and 5 upper deck rooms which were all designed and furnished by Jochen Dahms. A special highlight in addition to the “Anna restaurant” is the tower suite 001 with its view overlooking Munich.

Cosmopolitan Hotel
Opened in 1995, the city hotel is located directly in Munich's Schwabing district only 5 minutes away from the “English Garden”. The well known “Münchner Freiheit” and subway stations can be reached in only 3 minutes walking distance. Travel time to the airport is 45 minutes, 30 minutes to the exhibitions centre and 10 minutes to the main train station.
Available at the Cosmopolitan Hotel are 63 double rooms, 8 junior suites and 35 underground parking spaces.
All rooms of the hotel are furnished with Ligne Roset interior.

Company history
The Geisel Family began working in the hotel and restaurant industry at the beginning of the 20th century by managing the Löwenbräu beer tent at the Munich Oktoberfest. Afterwards, Karl and Anna Geisel opened the restaurant “Pasinger Weinbauer” which was quickly followed by three further restaurants.
In 1935, the family opened their first hotel. The following year, they purchased the Hotel Excelsior, which was followed two years later by the Hotel Königshof.
Three generations later, the management of the hotels, the vineyard, and a wine store is shared between the brothers Carl, Michael, and Stephan Geisel.
In 1995, they opened the Cosmopolitan Hotel in Munich's Schwabing district, followed by the opening of their fourth hotel, the design hotel anna, located in Munich's centre at Karlsplatz/Stachus in 2002.

Chronology
 1900: First time management of the renowned Löwenbräu beer tent at Munich's Oktoberfest.
 1923/24: Opening of the restaurants Pasinger Weinbauer and “Zum Brüderl” by Anna and Karl Geisel.
 1933: Opening of the restaurant Bürgerbräu.
 1935: Opening of the Hotel Rheinhof at Munich's main station as one of the most modern hotels in Munich.
 1936: Take over of the Hotel Excelsior.
 1938: Purchase of the Hotel Königshof.
 1943: Demolition of the Hotel Rheinhof and the Hotel Königshof by bombing raids.
 1945: Confiscated Hotel Excelsior is used as command headquarters by the Allied Forces.
 1950: Rebuilding of the Hotel Königshof by Karl Geisel, son of the founding couple, and his wife Maria .
 1956: Returning of the Hotel Excelsior after the American occupation to the Geisel's.
 1959: Reopening of the Hotel Excelsior after renovation.
 1970: Management of the Hotels alienate to Helga and Carl B. Geisel. General Renovation work is done in close cooperation with the famous interior designer Sigward Graf Pilati.
 1972: Reopening of the Hotel Königshof as a new luxury hotel to the Olympic Games in Munich.
 1973: Gourmet Restaurant Königshof was awarded with a coveted Michelin Star.
 1978: Renovation of the Gourmet Restaurant Königshof with focus on nouvelle cuisine.
 1986: Renovation of the Hotel Excelsior by Sigward Graf Pilati.
 1989: Key role of the Hotel Excelsior by establishing the Summit Hotels & Resorts.
 1991: Establishment of Geisel's Vinothek.
 1995: Opening of the Cosmopolitan Hotel - furnished by Ligne Roset - in Schwabing by the brothers Carl, Michael and Stephan Geisel.
 1996: A new renovation of the Hotel Königshof.
 1998: The restaurant guide Gault Millau awarded the Gourmet Restaurant Königshof with 18 out of 20 points.
 2000: Opening of the wine shop allaboutwine  (now Geisel's Weingalerie) in the ground floor of the Hotel Königshof.
 2001: Room number reduction of the Hotel Königshof due to the creating of two new categories (superior and deluxe).
 2002: Opening of the anna hotel, directly located at the Karlsplatz/Stachus.
 2003: Addition of the Hotel Königshof on the executive list of “The Leading Small Hotels of the World”.
 2008: Award “Hotelier of the Year” given to the brothers Carl, Michael and Stephan Geisel.

External links
 Geisel Privathotels
 Geisel Privathotels Brochure, Company history

Hotel and leisure companies of Germany